Scarlino is a comune (municipality) in the Province of Grosseto in the Italian region Tuscany, located about  southwest of Florence and about  northwest of Grosseto.

Scarlino borders the following municipalities: Castiglione della Pescaia, Follonica, Gavorrano, Massa Marittima.

History
Scarlino appeared before the year 1000 as a possession of the Aldobrandeschi family, and was later handed over to the bishops of Roselle and then the Alberti family. In the 13th century it was acquired again by the Aldobrandeschi, but later it passed to Pisa and then the Appiani of Piombino.

Scarlino remained part of the Principality of Piombino until the early 19th century, when it became part of the Grand Duchy of Tuscany.

Frazioni 
The municipality is formed by the municipal seat of Scarlino and the villages (frazioni) of Pian d'Alma, Puntone di Scarlino and Scarlino Scalo.

Government

List of mayors

Main sights
Walls, built from the 11th century and restored in the 13th century.
Rocca Aldobrandesca ("Aldobrandeschi Castle"), including an angular and a round towers, plus stone defensive walls.
Church and convent of San Donato, which was the seat of the Augustinians from the 14th century. The church is in Romanesque style.
Oratory of Santa Croce, with Renaissance frescoes.
Church of San Martino (14th century).
Convent of Monte Muro.

References

External links

Official website

 
Castles in Italy